Packer or Packers may refer to:

People 
 Packer (Middlesex cricketer) (c. 1765 – after 1795)
 Alferd Packer (1842–1907), American prospector and confessed cannibal
 Andrew Packer (born 1980), Australian footballer
 Ann Packer (born 1942), English sprinter, hurdler and long jumper
 Ann Packer (author) (born 1959), American novelist
 Asa Packer (1805–1879), American businessman and founder of Lehigh University
 Billy Packer (1940–2023), American college basketball commentator
 Boyd K. Packer (1924–2015), American religious leader and educator
 Brian Packer (born 1944), British boxer
 Charles Sandys Packer (1810–1883), Australian composer
 Chris Packer (c. 1953 – 2013), Australian sailor
 Clyde Packer (1935–2001), Australian businessman and politician
 Craig Packer (born 1950), American biologist
 David Packer (actor) (born 1962), American actor
 David Packer (artist) (born 1960), American and English artist
 Dick Packer (fl. 1953–1968), American soccer player
 Doris Packer (1904–1979), American actress
 Douglas Packer (born 1987), Brazilian footballer
 Earl L. Packer (1894–1993), American diplomat
 Erica Packer (born 1977), Australian singer and model
 Frank Packer (1906–1974), Australian media proprietor
 Fred L. Packer (1886–1956), American illustrator and cartoonist
 Frederick Augustus Packer (1839–1902), Australian composer
 Gabi Packer (fl. 1984–1997), Israeli footballer
 George Packer (born 1960), American journalist and novelist
 Greg Packer (born 1963), American highway maintenance worker known for being quoted as a "man on the street" in periodicals and television broadcasts
 Harry Packer (1868–1946), Wales international rugby player
 Herbert Annesley Packer (1894–1962), British naval officer
 Herbert L. Packer (1925–1972), American legal scholar and criminologist
 Horace Billings Packer (1851–1940), American politician from Pennsylvania
 J. I. Packer (1926–2020), British-born Canadian theologian
 James Packer (born 1967), Australian businessman and investor
 Jane Packer (1959–2011), British florist
 John Black Packer (1824–1891), American politician from Pennsylvania
 John Hayman Packer (1730–1806), English actor
 John Packer (born 1946), British Anglican bishop
 Joy Packer (1905–1977), South African author
 Juliet Law Packer (born c. 1952), American television writer
 Kelley Packer (fl. 2012–2018), American politician from Idaho
 Kerry Packer (1937–2005), Australian media magnate
 Madison Packer (born 1991), American ice hockey player
 Marlie Packer (born 1989), British rugby union player
 Mez Packer (born 1966), English novelist
 Mick Packer (born 1950), English footballer
 Mike Packer (fl. 1980s–2007), English dramatist, actor and poet
 Milton Packer (born c. 1951), American cardiologist
 Phil Packer (born 1972), British charity activist
 Philip Packer (1618–1686), English barrister and architect
 Richard Packer (civil servant), British civil servant
 Richard Packer (politician) (1794–1872), New Zealand politician
 Robert Packer (1614–1692), English politician
 Robert Packer (died 1731) (1678–1731), British politician
 Robert Clyde Packer (1879–1934), Australian businessman
 Roslyn Packer (born 1937), Australian philanthropist
 Russell Packer (born 1989), New Zealand rugby league footballer
 Ruth Packer (1910–2005), English opera singer
 Suzanne Packer (born 1958), Welsh actress
 Toni Packer (1927–2013), German-American Buddhist educator
 Vin Packer, pseudonym of the American author Marijane Meaker (born 1927)
 Walter Packer (born 1955), American football player
 Wes Packer (born 1977), Welsh comedian
 Will Packer (born 1974), American film producer
 William F. Packer (1807–1870), American politician from Pennsylvania
 William Packer (Major-General) (fl. 1644–1662), English soldier, preacher and politician
 ZZ Packer (born 1973), American author

Sports teams 
 Green Bay Packers, an American football team in Green Bay, Wisconsin
 Anderson Packers, a former professional basketball team that played for Anderson, Indiana in 3 different leagues, from 1946 to 1951
 Chicago Packers, the former name of the NBA team the Washington Wizards, when they played in Chicago, Illinois for the 1961–62 NBA season
 Kansas City Packers, a Federal League baseball team from 1914 to 1915

Occupations 
 A pack train operator (e.g. outfitter)
 A meat packer
 A household goods packer for moving, see moving company

Places 
 Packer, Arizona, a populated place situated in Yavapai County, Arizona, US
 Packer Township, Carbon County, Pennsylvania, US

Other uses 
 Production packer, a standard component of the completion hardware of oil or gas wells used to isolate a section of a borehole
 Cultipacker, an agricultural roller
 A packer is a phallic object worn to simulate male genitals, see packing (phallus)
 The Packer Collegiate Institute
 Runtime packer, a software component used to reduce executable sizes
 Todd Packer, fictional character in the American television series The Office
 Packer family, an Australian media and political family
 The Packers, an American soul group
 The Packer, newspaper and website covering the fresh produce industry
 Chicago Packer, a newspaper which catered to the interests of commercial growers, produce handlers, and poultry farmers

See also 
 Pack (disambiguation)
 Packe, a surname
 Packer House (disambiguation)
 Packing (disambiguation)